The Herefordshire County League was an English football league based in the county of Herefordshire. The league, which is sponsored by Supercraft Structures Limited, currently has three divisions – the Premier Division, Division One, and Division Two. The league was affiliated to the Herefordshire County FA.

Whilst the Herefordshire League was not officially part of the National League System, clubs who won this league could apply to enter to the lower division of the West Midlands (Regional) League. This effectively (though unofficially) put the top division of the league at level 13 of the English football league system.

The league occasionally had clubs from Wales as members – most recently in 2010, Hay St. Mary's entered their third team into the league in the Premier Division.

The League was wound up at the end of the 2015–16 season and replaced by The Herefordshire FA County League.

Recent divisional champions

External links
 Herefordshire League on the FA full-time website

References

 
Football in Herefordshire
Defunct football leagues in England
Sports leagues established in 1899
1899 establishments in England
Sports leagues disestablished in 2016
2016 disestablishments in England